The Roman Catholic Church in El Salvador (continental Central America) comprises only a Latin hierarchy, joint in the national episcopal conference (Conferencia Episcopal de El Salvador, CEDES), consisting of
 one ecclesiastical province headed by the Metropolitan archbishop (in the capital) with seven suffragan dioceses, each headed by a bishop 
 a military ordinariate for the military.

There are no Eastern Catholic or pre-diocesan jurisdictions.

There is also an Apostolic Nunciature to El Salvador, as papal diplomatic representation (embassy-level) in the national capital San Salvador.

Current Latin Dioceses

Exempt 
 Military Ordinariate of El Salvador (Spanish: Obispado Castrense en El Salvador), a modern Army bishopric

Ecclesiastical province of San Salvador 
 Metropolitan Archdiocese of San Salvador
 Roman Catholic Diocese of Chalatenango
 Roman Catholic Diocese of San Miguel
 Roman Catholic Diocese of San Vicente
 Roman Catholic Diocese of Santa Ana
 Roman Catholic Diocese of Santiago de María
 Roman Catholic Diocese of Sonsonate
 Roman Catholic Diocese of Zacatecoluca

Defunct jurisdictions 
There are no titular sees.

All defunct (notably promoted) jurisdictions have current Latin successor sees.

See also 
 List of Catholic dioceses (structured view)

Sources and external links 
 GCatholic.org - data for all sections.
 Catholic-Hierarchy entry.

El Salvador
Catholic dioceses